Magdalena Duduzile Hlengwa (born 21 November 1951) is a South African politician who has been a Member of the National Assembly of South Africa since May 2019. Hlengwa is a member of the Inkatha Freedom Party.

Early life and career
Hlengwa was born on 21 November 1951 in Melmoth in the former Natal Province. Her mother was a housewife, while her father worked on the railway. Her mother was also from the Biyela clan. Hlengwa matriculated from Masibumbane High School in Ulundi. She trained as a nurse but her family did not approve of her working late-night shifts, so she then worked as a teacher.

Between 1998 and 2011, she was principal of Zalizwi Primary School in Ulundi.

Parliamentary career
In 2019, she stood for election to the South African National Assembly as 5th on the Inkatha Freedom Party's regional list. At the May election, Hlengwa won a seat in the National Assembly. Hlengwa received her committee assignments on 27 June 2019.

Committee assignments
Portfolio Committee on Health
Portfolio Committee on Women, Youth and People with Disabilities

Personal life
Hlengwa was married to Dalton Hlengwa until 1984, when he died. They had a daughter together. Hlengwa also has two grandchildren and two great-grandchildren.

References

External links
Ms Magdalena Duduzile Hlengwa at Parliament of South Africa

Living people
Zulu people
Members of the National Assembly of South Africa
Inkatha Freedom Party politicians
21st-century South African politicians
1951 births